The 1972–73 Segunda División was the 24th season of the Mexican Segunda División. The season started on 26 November 1972 and concluded on 5 July 1973. It was won by Ciudad Madero.

As of this season, the promotion playoff was established between the Second and Third Division. The penultimate and antepenultimate classified of this category had to play a series against the second and third place of the Third Division.

Changes 
 Atlas was promoted to Primera División.
 Irapuato was relegated from Segunda División.
 Universidad Veracruzana was relegated from Segunda División.
 Orizaba, Tecnológico de Celaya, U. de G. and UAEM were promoted from Tercera División.
 Lobos Querétaro was disqualified for debts with the FMF.
 La Piedad and Nacional asked for hiatus and did not take part in this season.
 Tepic was renamed as Universidad de Nayarit.

Teams

Group stage

Group A

Group 1

Results

Promotion Playoff

Final

Relegation Playoff

References 

1972–73 in Mexican football
Segunda División de México seasons